Véronique Courjault (born Fièvre; 1968) is a French citizen who confessed to having killed three of her babies, two of whom she stored in a freezer at her home.  Her case has been referred to in the media as the "affaire des bébés congelés," or "freezer babies" case.

The Courjault family
Véronique Courjault (born in 1968 in the French department of Maine-et-Loire) is the wife of engineer Jean-Louis Courjault (born in 1966). After their marriage in 1994, they were known to have had two sons born in 1995 and 1997.

After living in France, the couple moved to Seoul, South Korea in 2002, while maintaining a home in the French city of Tours.

Chronology of events
On July 23, 2006, Jean-Louis Courjault, returning to Seoul after vacationing in France, found two infant corpses in the family freezer. A few days later, DNA tests performed by South Korean authorities confirmed that the infants were those of the Courjaults.

On August 22, 2006, Jean-Louis and Véronique Courjault held a press-conference during which the couple contested the DNA results and called the media "a lynch mob" that was in conspiracy with commercial rivals of Jean-Louis Courjault.

The case was transferred to France where new DNA tests were ordered. On October 12, 2006, Véronique Courjault admitted to killing both infants and freezing their remains after she gave birth to them in 2002 and 2003 in South Korea. She also confessed to killing a third infant and burning its body in a fireplace in 1999 while the couple still lived in France.

In January 2009, the case against Jean-Louis Courjault was dismissed.  He stated publicly that he had never been aware of his wife's pregnancies and that she had in fact kept them secret by wearing loose clothing and through a process referred to as denial of pregnancy.

On June 18, 2009, Véronique Courjault was found guilty of having murdered her three infants by the French court and was sentenced to eight years in prison.

A large debate in the Francophone press emerged over the summer of 2009 concerning the basis for Courjault's denial of the three pregnancies and whether she had deliberately deceived her husband with the intention of murdering the infants. Swiss television (TSR) in Geneva aired an interview with American child psychiatrist Daniel Schechter, a specialist in the diagnosis and treatment of peripartum psychopathology. Schechter described "denial of pregnancy" as a serious symptom of a psychiatric disturbance that can have several possible etiologies.

Véronique Courjault was released from jail on May 17, 2010. She had spent almost four years behind bars.

See also
 Infanticide
 Celine Lesage
 Dominique Cottrez
 List of serial killers by country

References

1968 births
French female serial killers
French murderers of children
Living people
People from Maine-et-Loire